Barnes Woods Archeological District is a national historic district located near Seaford, Sussex County, Delaware.  The district includes four contributing sites.  They are two small base camps and two procurement camps, representing a segment of the settlement system of Native American groups living in the Nanticoke River drainage between about 3000 B.C. and A.D. 1700.

It was added to the National Register of Historic Places in 1996.

References

Archaeological sites on the National Register of Historic Places in Delaware
Historic districts on the National Register of Historic Places in Delaware
Geography of Sussex County, Delaware
National Register of Historic Places in Sussex County, Delaware
Nanticoke River
Nanticoke tribe